"Hypnotize" is a song by Armenian American heavy metal band System of a Down. It was released in October 2005 as the lead single from their fifth studio album of the same name. The video was filmed on September 28, 2005, at the Van Andel Arena in Grand Rapids, Michigan. It reached number one on Billboards Hot Modern Rock Tracks chart and is the band's biggest international hit.

Music video
The music video is mostly footage from one of the band's September 2005 concerts, (filmed at Van Andel Arena in Grand Rapids, Michigan) but includes a CGI scene of painting along with the music; the audio is dubbed over with the studio track.

Track listing

Chart positions

Certifications

References

External links
"Hypnotize" lyrics on the band's official website
Marcus Northbridge's Analysis

2005 songs
2005 singles
System of a Down songs
Songs written by Daron Malakian
Songs written by Serj Tankian
Song recordings produced by Rick Rubin